Louis Sylvain Goma (born 24 June 1941 in Pointe-Noire) is a Congolese politician who was Prime Minister of Congo-Brazzaville from 18 December 1975 to 7 August 1984, serving under three successive Heads of State: Marien Ngouabi, Jacques Yhombi-Opango, and Denis Sassou Nguesso. Later, he was Secretary-General of the Economic Community of Central African States from 1999 to 2012, and he has been Congo-Brazzaville's Ambassador to Argentina since 2019.

Career
Prime Minister Henri Lopès and his government resigned after a meeting of the Congolese Labour Party's Central Committee in December 1975, and Goma was appointed to replace him at the head of a new government, composed of 14 members, on 18 December 1975. Goma and Denis Sassou Nguesso were the two deputies of Joachim Yhombi-Opango from March 1977 to February 1979. 

After the June–October 1997 civil war, Goma was included as one of the 75 members of the National Transitional Council (CNT), which served as a transitional legislature from 1998 to 2002.

Considered close to President Denis Sassou Nguesso, Goma was Secretary-General of the Economic Community of Central African States (CEEAC) from 1999 to 2012. Soon after being replaced in his post at CEEAC in early 2012, Goma was appointed as Congo-Brazzaville's Ambassador to Brazil on 21 April 2012. He presented his credentials as Ambassador to Brazilian President Dilma Rousseff in January 2013.

In February 2019, he became Ambassador to Argentina.

References

1941 births
Living people
People from Pointe-Noire
Prime Ministers of the Republic of the Congo
Transport ministers of the Republic of the Congo
Public works ministers of the Republic of the Congo
Congolese Party of Labour politicians
Vice presidents of the Republic of the Congo